Christ the Saviour Church is an Eastern Orthodox church in Riga, the capital of Latvia. The church is situated at 76 Vienības Street.

References 

Churches in Riga